Mariève Provost (born April 15, 1985) is a Canadian women's ice hockey player that competed for the Moncton Blue Eagles women's ice hockey program. In her final university campaign, she became the all-time leading scorer in CIS history. She registered for the 2012 CWHL Draft.

Playing career

CIS
At the midway point of the 2008-09 CIS season, Marieve Provost led the CIS in scoring with 15 goals and 27 assists in 11 conference games.

In the first 12 conference games of the 2010-11 CIS season, Provost led the CIS in scoring with 30 points (14-16-30). At the midway point of that season, she ranked third in CIS all-time scoring with 205 points (105-100-205). On March 22, 2009, les Aigles Bleues participated in the bronze medal game of the 2009 CIS National Championships. Marieve Provost scored the game-winner in a shootout with a 3-2 victory over the Manitoba Bisons. Moncton was the fourth-seeded team in the tournament and captured the Atlantic conference's first-ever medal at the CIS women's hockey championship.

All-time points record
The weekend of February 12 and 13, 2011, she earned two goals and three assists over two games to increase her career totals to 108 goals and 107 assists. She reached 215 points in 102 regular season matches. Heading into the weekend, she was tied with former Alberta Pandas player Danielle Bourgeois with 106 goals. She required four points to break the scoring record of 213 set by Tarin Podloski, also from Alberta.

She scored her 107th career goal on February 12, during the power play in a 6-2 road win over Saint Mary’s. In the third period of that same game, she tied Podloski’s point record. Provost logged an assist on Valérie Boisclair’s goal. The following day, she assisted on Kristine Labrie’s goal to pick up career point 214, against St. Thomas. In overtime, Provost would assist on another goal by Boisclair, the game winning tally.

Hockey Canada
She represented Canada in their entry at the 2009 World Universidade, which was the first appearance for the Canadian women in ice hockey at the Universidade. Provost finished the seven game tournament with seven points (four goals, three assists). Two years later, she would play for Canada at the 2011 World Universidade, and claim a second gold medal.

Career stats

CIS

Hockey Canada

Awards and honours
2010-11 Université de Moncton Female Athlete of the Year

AUS
2006-07 AUS Most Valuable Player
2009-10 AUS First Team All-Star
2009-10 AUS Most Valuable Player
2010-11 AUS Most Valuable Player

CIS
 2007-08 CIS First Team All-Star 
 2007-08 CIS All-Rookie team 
 2009 CIS Playoff All-Star team
 2009-10 CIS First Team All-Star
 2010-11 CIS First Team All-Star
 2010-11 CIS Scoring Champion

References

1985 births
Living people
Canadian women's ice hockey forwards
Ice hockey people from Quebec
Sportspeople from Laval, Quebec
Universiade medalists in ice hockey
Universiade gold medalists for Canada
Competitors at the 2009 Winter Universiade
Competitors at the 2011 Winter Universiade
European Women's Hockey League players